Satyrium acadica, the Acadian hairstreak, is a butterfly of the family Lycaenidae. It is found in North America from British Columbia east to Nova Scotia and south to Idaho, Colorado, the northern Midwest, Maryland, and New Jersey.

The wingspan is 29–38 mm. Like other hairstreaks, each hindwing has two tails near the tip. The shorter, upper tail is very short and often does not look at all like a tail. The upperside is brown grey, while the underside of the hindwings is grey. Adults are on wing from June to August in one generation per year. They feed on flower nectar of various flowers such as butterflyweed, milkweeds, and thistles. 

The larvae feed on the leaves of Salix species, including S. nigra and S. sericea. The species overwinters as an egg.

Subspecies
Satyrium acadica acadica
Satyrium acadica coolinense (Watson & Comstock, 1920)
Satyrium acadica montanense (Watson & Comstock, 1920)
Satyrium acadica watrini (Dufrane, 1939)

References

External links
Acadian Hairstreak, Butterflies of Canada

acadia
Butterflies of North America
Butterflies described in 1862
Taxa named by William Henry Edwards